The Water Diviner is a 2014 drama film starring and directed by Russell Crowe, in his directorial debut, and written by Andrew Anastasios and Andrew Knight. The film is loosely based on the book of the same name written by Andrew Anastasios and Dr. Meaghan Wilson-Anastasios. It follows an Australian farmer, Joshua Connor (Crowe), who travels to Turkey soon after World War I to find his three sons who never returned.

The film co-stars Olga Kurylenko, Jai Courtney, Cem Yılmaz, Yılmaz Erdoğan, and Jacqueline McKenzie. The Water Diviner had its world premiere at the State Theatre in Sydney, Australia on 2 December 2014. It opened in Australian and New Zealand cinemas on 26 December 2014. The film had a limited release in the United States on 24 April 2015.

Plot
The film begins in 1919, just after World War I has ended, and centres around Joshua Connor (Russell Crowe), an Australian farmer and water diviner. His three sons Arthur (Ryan Corr), Edward (James Fraser), and Henry (Ben O'Toole) served with the Australian and New Zealand Army Corps (ANZAC) during the military campaign in Gallipoli four years previously and are presumed dead. After his wife Eliza (Jacqueline McKenzie) commits suicide out of grief, Joshua resolves to bring his sons' bodies home and bury them with their mother.

Joshua travels to Turkey and stays in a hotel in Istanbul run by war-widowed Ayshe (Olga Kurylenko), but is unable to travel to Gallipoli by road. Learning the purpose of his journey, Ayshe tells him to bribe a local fisherman to travel to Gallipoli by boat. When he arrives, Joshua learns that ANZACs are engaged in a mass burial detail and all civilians are banned. Major Hasan (Yılmaz Erdoğan), a Turkish Army officer assisting the ANZACs, persuades the ANZAC captain Lieutenant Colonel Cyril Hughes (Jai Courtney) to prioritize helping Joshua with his search, as the only father to care enough to come all this way to find the fate of his sons. After finding Edward and Henry's graves, Joshua sees in his dreams that Arthur survives the battle. Hasan recognizes Joshua's surname and tells him that Arthur might have been taken prisoner.

Joshua returns to Istanbul, but fails to find out to which prison camp Arthur was transferred, as many Turkish records have been burned. He returns to Ayshe's hotel and learns that she is being pressed to marry her brother-in-law, Omer. Their argument becomes heated and Omer retreats when Joshua intervenes. Ayshe lashes out, blaming Joshua for making things worse and tells him to leave. As Joshua leaves the hotel, Omer and a few of his friends attack him, only to be stopped by Hasan's subordinate, Sergeant Jemal (Cem Yılmaz). Jemal takes Joshua to Hasan, who explains that the Greeks have invaded and they are going to defend their country as the British are not intervening. Joshua decides to travel with Hasan's group, who will pass through the region where his son might be. As Joshua returns to the hotel to retrieve his belongings, Ayshe apologizes for her earlier words.

While on the train, Jemal asks Joshua about a cricket bat he found in the Allied trenches when they retreated, as he is unsure whether it is a weapon or not. Joshua then explains to the Turkish soldiers on board the train the basic rules of cricket. However, Greek soldiers attack the train with only Jemal, Hasan and Joshua surviving the initial assault. Using the bat, Joshua saves Hasan as a Greek officer prepares to execute him but Jemal is killed in the resulting struggle. Joshua and Hasan flee to a nearby town where they spot a windmill, which Joshua saw in his recurring dream. There he finds Arthur alive but traumatized. Arthur reveals that at the end of the battle, Edward was still alive but badly wounded. He pleaded with Arthur to end his suffering, and Arthur reluctantly complied. Blaming himself for his brothers' death, Arthur felt he could never return to his family.

The Greek soldiers who previously attacked the train begin to attack the town, and the two men try to escape through the mountains. Arthur refuses to follow his father, but relents when Joshua says that without his wife and sons, he has nowhere else to go. They successfully evade the Greek army and return to Ayshe's hotel. The film ends with Joshua drinking a cup of coffee made by Ayshe which indicates that she has fallen in love with him.

Cast
 Russell Crowe as Joshua Connor
 Olga Kurylenko as Ayshe
 Dylan Georgiades as Orhan
 Yılmaz Erdoğan as Major Hasan
 Cem Yılmaz as Sergeant Jemal
 Jai Courtney as Lieutenant Colonel Cyril Hughes
 Ryan Corr as Arthur Connor
 Jacqueline McKenzie as Eliza Connor
 Isabel Lucas as Natalia
 Mert Fırat as Military Officer
 Daniel Wyllie as Captain Charles Brindley
 Damon Herriman as Father McIntyre
 Megan Gale as Fatma
 Deniz Akdeniz as Imam
 Steve Bastoni as Omer
 James Fraser as Edward Connor
 Ben O'Toole as Henry Connor
 Robert Mammone as Colonel Demergelis
 Charlie Allan as Soldier At The Station Hall
Michael Dorman as Greeves 
Sophia Forrest as Edith 
Christopher Sommers as Tucker

Production
The story concept originated from a single line in a letter written by Lieutenant-Colonel Cyril Hughes, who was a worker in the Imperial War Graves unit. The footnote simply said, “One old chap managed to get here from Australia, looking for his son’s grave.” After a year of research, the writers were unable to identify the man or his son, which gave them the freedom to imagine a story which would become their screenplay.

On 18 June 2013, it was announced that Crowe had signed to make his directorial debut with an historical drama film The Water Diviner from a screenplay written by Andrew Knight and Andrew Anastasios. He would also star in the film. Producers would be Troy Lum, Andrew Mason and Keith Rodger and it was set to be shot in Australia and Turkey. On 25 March 2014, it was announced that Seven West Media and Seven Group Holdings would co-finance the film. On 7 November 2014, Warner Bros. acquired the US rights to the film.

Casting
Crowe portrays Joshua Connor, an Australian farmer. Olga Kurylenko was added to the cast on 18 October 2013 to co-star with Crowe. On 24 October, Jai Courtney was announced as having signed to star in The Water Diviner and another historical film, Unbroken. Courtney first filmed Unbroken and then moved to The Water Diviner, playing a soldier, Lt. Col. Cecil Hughes. Later, Turkish actors Cem Yılmaz and Yılmaz Erdoğan were also added to the cast, along with some Australian actors: Ryan Corr, Daniel Wyllie, Damon Herriman, Deniz Akdeniz, Steve Bastoni and Jacqueline McKenzie.

Filming
Principal photography began on 2 December 2013 in Australia.

Marketing
On 1 February 2014, the first official still from the film was revealed. On 28 April, the first footage from the film in a 7-minute featurette, narrated by Crowe, was revealed. The first official trailer for the film was released on 30 September.

Release
The film was released in Australia, New Zealand, and Turkey on 26 December 2014, and it was released in Thailand on 15 January 2015. The film was initially to be released in the UK on 23 January 2015 but was moved to 3 April. The film was released in IMAX, and general, theaters by Warner Bros. in the United States on 24 April 2015. Entertainment One and Universal Pictures jointly released the film in Australia, with eOne solely releasing the film in Europe and Canada.

The film made its free-to-air television premiere on the Seven Network in Australia on 20 April 2015, a mere four months after its theatrical release in Australia for the centennial anniversary of ANZAC Day. Seven is an investor in the film.

Reception

Critical response
On Rotten Tomatoes, the film has an approval rating of 61% based on 150 reviews; the average rating is 6.05/10. The website's critical consensus reads, "The Water Diviner finds Russell Crowe on somewhat uncertain footing as a director, but he's rescued by a strong performance from himself in the leading role." On Metacritic, the film has a score of 50 out of 100, based on 36 critics, indicating "mixed or average reviews". Audiences polled by CinemaScore gave the film an average grade of "A -" on an A+ to F scale.

Calls for a protest and boycott of the film on social media resulted in the Facebook page "Protest and Boycott the Water Diviner" which has over 16,000 fans. Descendants of victims of the 1915 Armenian genocide, Assyrian genocide and Greek genocide were incensed by the film's portrayal of the Turks as victims, at the same time that Turks were committing atrocities against their minorities. Various film critics described the movie as "a distortion of history that only serves to appease Turkey and its continued agenda of genocide denial." Anthony McAdam of The Spectator wrote: "Leaving aside aesthetic considerations, the fact is the film's lack of any historical context is breathtaking." McAdam notes that there is one "glaring omission" in the film, that being the lack of any mention of the Armenian genocide. Andrew O'Hehir of Salon questioned why Crowe and Warner Bros. released the film in the US on 24 April, the same day that Armenians commemorate the Armenian genocide, comparing it to releasing a film which ignores the Jewish Holocaust on Yom HaShoah.

Box office
The Water Diviner grossed $30.8 million worldwide. On 5 January 2015, it was named the highest grossing Australian-produced film of 2014, with a gross of $12,294,472. However, in many cinemas in the UK it was screened for just one week.

The film was received very favourably in Turkey at its debut and subsequent release. To date, the film has taken almost 14.3 million ($5.7 million).

Accolades

1 Shared award with The Babadook

References

External links

 
 
 The Water Diviner movie review and trailer at SBS Movies
 The Water Diviner at the World Socialist Web Site

2014 films
Australian World War I films
2010s adventure drama films
2010s war films
Australian epic films
Australian war drama films
American war drama films
2014 multilingual films
English-language Turkish films
2010s Turkish-language films
World War I films based on actual events
Drama films based on actual events
Dune Entertainment films
IMAX films
Universal Pictures films
Warner Bros. films
Films directed by Russell Crowe
Films scored by David Hirschfelder
Films about farmers
Films about the Gallipoli campaign
Films about missing people
Films set in Australia
Films set in Turkey
Films set in Istanbul
Films set in the Ottoman Empire
Films set in 1919
Films shot in Australia
Films shot in Turkey
2014 directorial debut films
2014 drama films
2010s English-language films
Australian multilingual films
American multilingual films
2010s American films